Derech Etz Chaim (DEC) is a post-high school religious yeshiva located in Har Nof, West Jerusalem. It was designed for students to spend a year or more studying Torah after completing their high school studies and before embarking to university studies.  Studies focus primarily on the study of Talmud, and are intended to give students the ability and confidence to carry on learning Torah independently after leaving DEC.

History
DEC was founded in 1998 by Rav Aharon Katz, who received semicha (rabbinic ordination) from both R' Yaakov Weinberg and R' Moshe Halberstam.  DEC is affiliated with the Jewish Agency’s MASA Program

Educational philosophy
A stated goal is to allow students to build a strong foundation in Judaism before beginning university studies.

Daily Schedule

The daily schedule is divided into three major study segments: Morning seder is devoted to in depth study, followed by a lecture.  The afternoon is a lighter program including group review and with the expectation of covering large amounts of material.   Evenings are open study as per the students choice.

Classes are offered on a variety of subjects including Chumash, Halacha, Machshava, Parshat Hashavua, Sefer Hachinuch, and Mussar.

Student life
The DEC facility is a four-story villa containing the dormitory, dining room, weight room, lounge areas, Beit Medrash and Shiur rooms. Each floor has views overlooking the Jerusalem Forest.  Shabbos and Yom Tov meals take place in Yeshiva twice a month. DEC participates annually in the American Flag Football League in Israel each fall/winter. In 2009, Derech Etz Chaim became the Flag Football Champions of the AFI league.

During the year program the school provides a number of trips around Israel.

References

Orthodox yeshivas in Jerusalem